Colonial House is a historic seven-story building in West Hollywood, California, U.S. It was built in 1930, and it was designed by architect Leland A. Bryant. It has been listed on the National Register of Historic Places since April 15, 1982.

Description 

The architectural style is French colonial, and it was built on an  lot just south of Sunset Boulevard.The Colonial House has long been a home to celebrities. Some early Hollywood residents have included Bette Davis, Cary Grant, Clark Gable, Carol Lombard, Myrna Loy, Eddie Cantor, William Powell, Norma Talmadge and Joan Blondell. In recent years pop singer Katy Perry purchased a residence, continuing the building's legacy for being a home for stars.

References 

Buildings and structures on the National Register of Historic Places in California
Colonial Revival architecture in California
Houses completed in 1930
Buildings and structures in West Hollywood, California